The 1938 Colorado Buffaloes football team was an American football team that represented the University of Colorado as a member of the Mountain States Conference (MSC) during the 1938 college football season. Led by fourth-year head coach Bunny Oakes, the Buffaloes compiled an overall record of 3–4–1 with a mark of 3–2–1 in conference play, tying for second place in the MSC. This was the program's first year in the MSC.

Schedule

References

Colorado
Colorado Buffaloes football seasons
Colorado Buffaloes football